Onur Demirtaş (born 30 January 1982) is a Turkish former professional footballer.

References

1982 births
Living people
Turkish footballers
Türk Telekom G.S.K. footballers
Adana Demirspor footballers
Adanaspor footballers
Eyüpspor footballers
Association football midfielders